Green tree snake may refer to either of the following non-venomous snakes:

 Morelia viridis, the green tree python, a python species found in New Guinea, various islands in Indonesia, and the Cape York Peninsula in Australia
 Dendrelaphis punctulatus, the Australian tree snake, a colubrid species found in Australia and Papua New Guinea

Animal common name disambiguation pages